Mentalize is the second solo album of Brazilian vocalist/pianist Andre Matos.

Track list 
 "Leading On!" – 05:08
 "I Will Return" – 05:10
 "Someone Else" – 05:47
 "Shift the Night Away" – 04:58
 "Back to You" – 04:14
 "Mentalize" – 04:05
 "The Myriad" – 05:08
 "When the Sun Cried Out" – 04:39
 "Mirror of Me" – 04:15
 "Violence" – 04:59
 "A Lapse in Time" – 02:42
 "Power Stream" – 04:13
 "Don't Despair" (bonus track for Brazil) – 05:08
 "Forever Is Too Long" (bonus track for Japan) – 04:02
 "Teo Torriatte (Let Us Cling Together)" (bonus track for Japan) – 04:58

Personnel
Andre Matos – vocals & piano
Andre Hernandes – guitars
Hugo Mariutti – guitars
Luis Mariutti – bass guitar
Eloy Casagrande – drums
Fabio Ribeiro – keyboards

2009 albums
Andre Matos albums